Sargocentron wilhelmi, or Wilhelm's squirrelfish, is a species of squirrelfish belonging to the genus Sargocentron. It is named after ichthyologist Friedrich Wilhelm. It is endemic to Easter Island in the Southeast Pacific Ocean.

References

wilhelmi
Fish of the Pacific Ocean
Taxa named by Fernando de Buen y Lozano
Endemic fauna of Chile